Ricardo José Villarraga Marchena (born 23 April 1990) is a Colombian footballer who plays as a defender for Fortuna Liga club FK Senica, on loan from Atlético Huila.

Club career

FK Senica
Ricardo Villarraga made his professional Fortuna Liga debut for FK Senica against FC ViOn Zlaté Moravce on March 31, 2018.

References

External links
 Futbalnet profile
 FK Senica official club profile
 

1990 births
Living people
Colombian footballers
Association football defenders
Independiente Santa Fe footballers
Atlético Juventud footballers
América de Cali footballers
Deportivo Pasto footballers
Atlético Huila footballers
FK Senica players
Slovak Super Liga players
Expatriate footballers in Slovakia
Footballers from Bogotá